Project Blowed is an open-mic workshop, its affiliated underground hip hop crew and record label based in Los Angeles, California at 3333 Leimert. This hip hop function started in 1994 and features many music groups, emcees, dancers, music producers, and graffiti artists local to the Southern California area.

History
The roots of Project Blowed can be traced back to the former Good Life Cafe, a health food center in then called South Central Los Angeles, California. It was described by UGSMAG as "a platform for rappers to perform their material" and "a testing ground for Los Angeles' independent rap scene". Lenny Kravitz, Snoop Dogg, Ice Cube, and cast members of the show "Beverly Hills 90210" reportedly attended the open-mic.

In 1994, Aceyalone and Abstract Rude produced the original Project Blowed compilation album.  It was released in 1995. In 2005, Project Blowed released a follow up album, Project Blowed: 10th Anniversary, on Decon.

Social impact
Project Blowed is the essential outlet for much of the LA underground hip hop culture. It is a place that many people of all genders can go to freestyle, rhyme, or just speak what is on their mind. Project Blowed was a turning point for the underground culture; it "did not fan the flames of urban decay and societal attacks. Project Blowed was putting out the fire." Rappers were required to pay a small fee to enter a battle and formally introduce themselves, and "MCs generally did not resort to homophobic slurs or excessive name calling during rap battles, as such behavior denoted lack of skill."  This group discouraged violent activity among the youth and encouraged strict norms and respect.

Blowed events provided a "creative outlet and alternative career outside of gang life" for young black men. One of these men, Trenseta,  after time in jail, spent time mentoring young rappers at Project Blowed. They successfully built a community and a network for these young, aspiring rappers.

Women
While male MCs were more prominent at Project Blowed, five female members consistently appeared in the beginning of Project Blowed. Medusa, a female MC, MCed Project Blowed for over twenty years. She was the first MC at Thursday Night and won many battles with men and women.

Expansion
With the expansion of the Blowdian roster to include newer groups such as Customer Service and Swim Team, Project Blowed has since opened  new additional workshops in California's Inland Empire to accompany its former primary location in Leimert Park, Los Angeles.
 Original location: Los Angeles, California (hosted by NGA FSH, Rhymin' Riddlore?, Chu Chu and J-Smoov)
 Expansion location: Inland Empire, California (hosted by Ganjah K)
 Additional locations: Las Vegas, Nevada (hosted by Phoenix Orion) and Austin, Texas (hosted by Tray Loc)

Notable artists

 Abstract Rude
 Aceyalone
 Busdriver
 C.V.E.
 Dibia$e
 Dumbfoundead
 Freestyle Fellowship
 Ngafsh
 Myka 9
 Nobody
 Nocando
 Omid
 Open Mike Eagle
 Orko Eloheim
 P.E.A.C.E.
 Pigeon John
 Psychosiz
 Ras G
 Sach
 Self Jupiter
 Subtitle
 Thavius Beck
 2Mex
 Volume 10

Compilation albums

See also
 List of record labels
 Underground hip hop

References

External links
 
 

 
American independent record labels
American hip hop record labels
Hip hop collectives
Hip hop groups from California
Musical groups established in 1989